St. Nicholas Chapel, commonly known as Russian Orthodox Church, is a historic Russian Orthodox church in Seldovia, Alaska, United States. The church was most likely built in 1891 and replaced a log church. Now it is under Diocese of Alaska of the Orthodox Church in America

The church's design features a bell tower with an octagonal, partly open belfry; the tower is topped by a tall cross. The church has a gable roof with a four-sided cupola in the middle, which is topped by another cross.

The chapel was added to the National Register of Historic Places in 1980.

See also
National Register of Historic Places listings in Kenai Peninsula Borough, Alaska

References

Buildings and structures in Kenai Peninsula Borough, Alaska
Churches on the National Register of Historic Places in Alaska
Russian Orthodox church buildings in Alaska
Buildings and structures on the National Register of Historic Places in Kenai Peninsula Borough, Alaska